Margo is a village in the Canadian province of Saskatchewan within the Rural Municipality of Sasman No. 336 and Census Division No. 10.

History 
Margo incorporated as a village on April 24, 1911.

Demographics 

See also 

 List of communities in Saskatchewan
 Villages of Saskatchewan

Footnotes

Villages in Saskatchewan
Sasman No. 336, Saskatchewan
Division No. 10, Saskatchewan